Ballowana is a village of Faisalabad District near a town Painsra in Punjab, Pakistan.

Villages in Faisalabad District